Jimmy Ball (born 1975 or 1976) is an English football coach who is the current manager of AFC Totton. Previously Ball had been employed with Forest Green Rovers as an under-18 team coach and interim manager of the first team.

Playing career
Ball was a youth player at Exeter City and Southampton during his father's managerial stints at the clubs. Ball later played senior football for BAT Sports.

Coaching career
Following his playing spell, Ball moved into coaching, coaching at Christchurch and Winchester City. In 2014, following coaching spells at Portsmouth and Irish club Shelbourne, Ball moved to the United States, to coach Puget Sound Gunners. Ball later returned to England, coaching in the academies at Blackburn Rovers and Stoke City.

On 11 April 2021, following the sacking of Mark Cooper and whilst working as the club's under-18 manager, Ball was appointed interim manager of Forest Green Rovers until the end of the 2020–21 season. After having failed to gain promotion, Rob Edwards was appointed head coach, and Ball went back to coach the under-18s team. He left the club with mutual consent in September 2021.

Ball was appointed first-team coach at League Two club Stevenage on 4 January 2022.

In March 2022, Ball was appointed as manager of Southern Football League side AFC Totton.

Personal life
Ball is the son of former 1966 World Cup winner Alan Ball Jr. and the grandson of Alan Ball Sr. All three family members have managed in the Football League.

Managerial statistics

References

1970s births
Living people
Association football coaches
English football managers
Totton & Eling F.C. players
English expatriate footballers
English expatriate sportspeople in the United States
English expatriate sportspeople in Ireland
Forest Green Rovers F.C. managers
English Football League managers
Portsmouth F.C. non-playing staff
Blackburn Rovers F.C. non-playing staff
Stoke City F.C. non-playing staff
Forest Green Rovers F.C. non-playing staff
Stevenage F.C. non-playing staff
English footballers
Association footballers not categorized by position
A.F.C. Totton managers